Chloroform is a chemical compound with the molecular formula CHCl3.

Chloroform may also refer to:
 "Chloroform" (song), a song by Phoenix
 "Chloroform", a song by Crystal Castles from Amnesty (I)
 "Chloroform", a song by SycAmour

See also
 Cloroform, a Norwegian alternative band